Hayat Plus or Hayat PLUS is a Bosnian satellite television channel operated by Hayat TV. The headquarters of the TV channel are located in Vogošća (near Sarajevo). The program is produced in the Bosnian language, and programming is dedicated to the Bosnian diaspora.

The program has been broadcasting since 2002 (formerly known as NTV Hayat SAT). The program consists of a variety of reportages about the life of Bosnians in Australia, the United States, and Europe, and it is made by direct contact with people in the diaspora. The most significant TV shows from the Hayat TV production are adjusted for people in other time zones, without commercials and interruptions. Hayat Plus cooperates with local TV stations in Bosnia and Herzegovina (BiH) and often broadcast their weekly chronicle.

Hayat Plus is available via cable systems throughout BiH and the former Yugoslavia (Balkan countries). Hayat Plus is part of a special Hayat TV package (with Hayat TV, Hayatovci, Hayat Music and Hayat Folk). A worldwide channel is available via the Eutelsat satellite provider.

References

External links 
 Official website www.hayat.ba
 Communications Regulatory Agency of Bosnia and Herzegovina

Television in Bosnia and Herzegovina
Television channels and stations established in 2002
Satellite television